Minnehaha is a neighborhood in the Nokomis community in Minneapolis, Minnesota. Its boundaries are Minnehaha Parkway to the north, Hiawatha Avenue to the east, 54th Street to the south, and 34th Avenue to the west. It shares a neighborhood organization with the Keewaydin, Morris Park, and Wenonah neighborhoods, which are collectively referred to as Nokomis East and served by the Nokomis East Neighborhood Association (NENA).

The 50th Street/Minnehaha Park station of the METRO Blue Line is located in Minnehaha.

References

External links
Minneapolis Neighborhood Profile - Minnehaha
Nokomis East Neighborhood Association

Neighborhoods in Minneapolis